La Danse may refer to:

Art
 Dance (Matisse) or La Danse, a painting by Henri Matisse 
 La Danse (Bouguereau), a painting by William-Adolphe Bouguereau
 La Danse, an artwork by Shelomo Selinger at La Défense, Paris
 La Danse, a sculpture by Francesc Viladomat at Casa de la Vall, Andorra
 La Danse (Carpeaux), a sculpture by Jean-Baptiste Carpeaux

Music
 La Danse, a ballet choreographed by Adeline Genée with music composed by Dora Bright
 La Danse, a ballet composed by Ernest Ford
 "La danse", a composition by Ethel Smyth
 "La Danse", a song by  Susan Herndon from In the Attic
 "La Danse", a song by Bündock from Cinéma 
 La danse, a composition by Moritz Moszkowski for piano
 La danse, a composition by Yasushi Akutagawa for piano

Film
 La Danse (film), a 2009 French documentary

See also
 La Dance (disambiguation)
 The Dance (disambiguation)
 Dance (disambiguation)